Olga Vladimirovna Kern (born Olga Pushechnikova, 23 April 1975) is a Russian-American classical pianist. She became an American citizen in 2016.

Early life
Olga Kern was born on 23 April 1975 in Moscow into a family of musicians with the last name of Pushechnikova. Her parents are both pianists, and she is related to the Russian socialite and memoirist Anna Petrovna Kern. Her great-grandmother was the mezzo-soprano Vera Pushechnikova.  Kern began studying piano at age five with Professor Evgeny Timakin at the Central Music School of Moscow and gave her first concert at age seven in the same city. She won her first international competition, the Concertino Praga Competition, at age 11 in the Czech Republic. At 17, she won first prize at the first Rachmaninoff International Piano Competition. While in school, she received an honorary scholarship from the President of Russia Boris Yeltsin in 1996.

Career

Early career
Kern continued her studies at the Moscow Conservatory with Professor Sergei Dorensky and continued her postgraduate studies at the same school. She also studied with Professor Boris Petrushansky at the Accademia Pianistica 'Incontri col Maestro' in Imola.  She adopted her mother's surname, Kern, professionally as her international career developed.  From 1989 to 1994, Kern held a scholarship with the “New Names” Foundation.

Van Cliburn International Piano Competition
Kern attended the Tenth Van Cliburn International Piano Competition in 1997 and did not progress past the R1 level. Kern attained international prominence when she became the first woman in over thirty years to receive the Nancy Lee and Perry R. Bass Gold Medal in the Eleventh Van Cliburn International Piano Competition in June 2001, which she won jointly with Stanislav Ioudenitch. She appears in three documentaries about the competition: Playing on the Edge (2001), They Came to Play (2008), and The Cliburn: 50 Years of Gold. An additional documentary was made about Kern following the 2001 Van Cliburn competition, titled Olga's Journey (2003).

Pedagogy
Besides performing, Kern is an active music pedagogue, and has conducted master classes at such locations as Yale University, the Royal Conservatoire of Scotland, and New York City's 92nd Street Y. Kern has been a jury member for several international competitions including Grand Prix Animato in Paris, France; the Scottish International Piano Competition in Glasgow, Scotland; Amadeus Competition in Brno, Czech Republic; and the Top of the World International Piano Competition in Tromsø, Norway. Kern was jury chairman for the Seventh Cliburn International Amateur Piano Competition in June 2016.

Kern is a corresponding member of the Russian Academy of Sciences’s Division of the Arts.  She was artistic director of the Cape Town Summer Festival from 2006 to 2011 and frequently returns.  In September 2017, Kern joined the piano faculty of the Manhattan School of Music.

Olga Kern International Piano Competition

In 2016, Kern launched the Olga Kern International Piano Competition for pianists between the ages of 18 and 32. Taking place every three years in Albuquerque, New Mexico, the competition's mission is to "provide the venue for young pianists to develop international careers through a competition that is recognized globally for its value and excellence." Kern serves as Artistic Director and President of the Jury.

The inaugural competition took place in Albuquerque November 13–20, 2016. Twenty-two contestants representing fourteen countries were chosen from submitted video auditions and judged by Kern along with eight other internationally-recognized judges. The competition gave away a total of $30,000 in prize money with the winner receiving $11,000 along with a professional recording on the Steinway & Sons Label and tours throughout Europe and the United States. Vladimir Kern conducted the finalist concert with the New Mexico Philharmonic.

In honor of the festival and of Kern, Albuquerque mayor Richard Berry issued an executive order declaring November 20 "Olga Kern Day," coinciding with the final day of the competition.

Olga Kern International Piano Competition Awards

2019
First prize -Tetiana Shafran (Ukraine)
Second prize- Federico Gad Crema (Italy)
Third prize-Simon Karakulidi(Russia)
Fourth prize-Elizaveta Kliuchereva (Russia)

Foundation

In 2012, Kern established the “Aspiration” foundation with her brother, conductor, composer, and teacher Vladimir Kern. The aim of the foundation is to provide financial and artistic assistance to developing young musicians throughout the world.

Awards

Recordings

2022 Brahms and Schostakovich quintets with Dali Quartet on Delos

Personal life
Kern lives in New York City. Her son is Vladislav Kern, who also plays the piano and graduated from Juilliard’s Pre-College School in May 2016.

References

External links
 
 Aspiration Foundation
 Olga Kern management, CAMI
 Olga Kern Management in Europe, Caecilia
 Vladislav Kern official website

1975 births
Living people
Russian women musicians
Russian classical pianists
Russian women pianists
American people of Russian descent
Moscow Conservatory alumni
Manhattan School of Music faculty
Child classical musicians
Prize-winners of the Van Cliburn International Piano Competition
21st-century women musicians
21st-century classical pianists
American women classical pianists
American classical pianists
Women music educators
American women academics
21st-century American women